The Große Eiskogel is a mountain in the Ortler Alps in South Tyrol, Italy, which rises to a height of  (or according to other sources, 3549, 3544 or 3530 m).

Location and surroundings 
The Große Eiskogel is the easternmost peak in the Kristallkamm, a mountain range in the Ortler Alps that runs from the Stilfser Joch in the west to the Ortler Pass. It is located in the South Tyrol part of this mountain group near the border with Lombardy and is protected within the Stilfserjoch National Park. In the east its summit block drops to the Ortler Pass, behind which Zebrù and the Ortler rise. In the southwest it is separated from the nearby Thurwieserspitze by the Thurwieserjoch saddle. Towards the northwest a ridge runs away in the direction of the Trafoital, on which rises the Kleine Eiskogel.

Ascent 
Despite its considerable height, the Große Eiskogel is a little-known South Tyrolean high summit. This is partly due to its remoteness, partly to its location between significantly higher and therefore more prominent mountains. The summit, which is always covered in firn, can only be reached via glaciers and Alpine crossings. It is often crossed when climbing the Thurwieserspitze. The closest support points for mountaineers are the Rifugio Quinto Alpini and the Bergl Hut.

References

Literature 
 Peter Holl:  Alpenvereinsführer Ortleralpen , 9th edition, Munich 2003, ISBN 3-7633-1313-3

External links 

 Großer Eiskogel on the Bergl Hut website

Three-thousanders
Ortler Alps
Mountains of Europe
Mountains of South Tyrol